The Ecuadorian Cycling Federation or FEC (in Spanish: Federación Ecuatoriana de Ciclismo) is the national governing body of cycle racing in Ecuador.

The FEC is a member of the UCI and COPACI.

External links
 Federación Ecuatoriana de Ciclismo official website

Cycle racing organizations
Cycle racing in Ecuador
Cycling